Anthony D. G. Pratt (born 27 November 1937) is a British production designer from London, England. He is the great nephew of William Henry Pratt, better known as Boris Karloff and the nephew of actress Gillian Pratt (a.k.a. Gillian Lind).

He was nominated for two Oscars, one for Hope and Glory and the other for The Phantom of the Opera.

In addition he has won two Emmy awards. He won for Rome and The Pacific.

Filmography
 Excalibur (1981)
 Hope and Glory (1987)
 Naked Tango (1991)
 Michael Collins (1996)
 The Man in the Iron Mask (1998)
 Grey Owl (1999)
 The End of the Affair (1999)
 Band of Brothers (2001) (mini) TV Series
 The Good Thief (2002)
 The Phantom of the Opera (2004)

References

External links
 

1937 births
Living people
Businesspeople from London
British film designers
Emmy Award winners